The Holden HD series is a range of automobiles which were produced by Holden in Australia from 1965 to 1966.

Overview
The Holden HD sedans and station wagons were released in February 1965 with coupe utility and panel van body styles following in July of that year. The HD range replaced the Holden EH series which had been in production since 1963. The HD had a completely new body, which was wider and longer than that of the EH and offered significant increases in passenger space, load space and equipment levels. Body styling exhibited strong similarities to Vauxhall's FC Victor of the previous year, including that car's unusual concave rear window. Disc brakes were offered for the first time on a Holden model  and the optional Hydramatic three–speed automatic transmission as used in the EH was replaced by a Powerglide two– speed unit. The HD was also the first Holden to be offered with a factory performance engine option, the "X2".
The HD is often confused with the later HR but can be recognised by the front indicators being mounted under the bumper (the HR had round indicators mounted in the grille) and the wrap around tail lights at the back (the HR had narrow lights that extended up the end of the rear fins but not around the edge)

Model range 
The Holden HD passenger vehicle range offered 4 door sedan and 5 door station wagon bodystyles in three trim levels with the six models marketed as:
 Holden Standard Sedan
 Holden Standard Station Sedan
 Holden Special Sedan
 Holden Special Station Sedan
 Holden Premier Sedan
 Holden Premier Station Sedan

The HD commercial vehicle range was offered in 2 door coupe utility and 2 door panel van variants, marketed as:
 Holden Utility
 Holden Panel Van

Engines and transmissions
Three versions of the inline six cylinder Holden Red motor were available. The 100 bhp  six  was standard in all models except the Premiers and a 115 bhp  six was standard on Premiers and optional on all other models. A 140 bhp "X2" version of the "179" was also available as an option on all models. The "X2" featured twin carburettors, a high-lift camshaft, new inlet and exhaust manifolds and a low-restriction exhaust system.  It also included a special instrument cluster and external "X2" badges.  A three speed manual transmission was standard on all models with a two speed "Powerglide" automatic gearbox available as an option.

A  Chevrolet six was fitted for the South African market.

Production and replacement
A total of 178,927 vehicles were produced up to April 1966 when the HD was replaced by the Holden HR series.

References

External links 
 A Brief History of the HD Holden at "The Sixties Holden Archives" Includes sales brochures
 Holden HD at www.uniquecarsandparts.com.au

Cars of Australia
HD
Cars introduced in 1965
Cars discontinued in 1966